The British Lightweight Championship was a top  British wrestling championship found throughout the country's circuit. The title's broken history dates back to the 1930s and it was most recently claimed actively in 2021 under the auspices of Rumble Promotions who have named their version in honour of late referee Mal Mason. The official upper weight limit for the belt was 11 stone (154 pounds).

The championship was recognised and defended on matches screened by UK national television network ITV as part of the professional wrestling slot on World of Sport as well as standalone broadcasts.  Pre-publicity for these championship match broadcasts was given in ITV's nationally published listings magazine TVTimes.

This is a history of the title from its earliest recorded origins in 1933. As indicated in the table a few claimed reigns are of dubious provenance and, whilst these have been noted, they are not included as official reigns.

Title history
Key

Footnotes

See also
Professional wrestling in the United Kingdom

References

Lightweight wrestling championships
National championships in the United Kingdom
Professional wrestling in the United Kingdom
National professional wrestling championships